Clarence is a city in Cedar County, Iowa, United States. The population was 1,039 at the time of the 2020 census.

History 
The community was originally called "Onion Grove" because of the widespread growth of wild onions along Mill Creek.  The village was moved in order to be close to a railroad line and the name was changed to "Clarence" on the suggestion of Clarence, New York native Richard Gere.

Clarence was incorporated in 1866.

Geography
Clarence is located at  (41.887827, -91.059171), along U.S. Route 30 and the historic Lincoln Highway.

U.S. Route 30 is an east–west highway passing through the community.

Demographics

2010 census
As of the census of 2010, there were 974 people, 418 households, and 252 families living in the city. The racial makeup of the city was 97.8% White, 0.2% African American, 0.3% Native American, 0.8% from other races, and 0.8% from two or more races. Hispanic or Latino of any race were 1.4% of the population.

There were 418 households, of which 27.5% had children under the age of 18 living with them, 51.2% were married couples living together, 5.0% had a female householder with no husband present, 4.1% had a male householder with no wife present, and 39.7% were non-families. 34.0% of all households were made up of individuals, and 19.1% had someone living alone who was 65 years of age or older. The average household size was 2.22 and the average family size was 2.87.

The median age in the city was 44.6 years. 21.7% of residents were under the age of 18; 5.7% were between the ages of 18 and 24; 23.3% were from 25 to 44; 24.2% were from 45 to 64; and 25.1% were 65 years of age or older. The gender makeup of the city was 44.9% male and 55.1% female.

2000 census
As of the census of 2000, there were 1,008 people, 423 households, and 269 families living in the city. The racial makeup of the city was 99.21% White, 0.10% Native American, 0.20% Asian, and 0.50% from two or more races. Hispanic or Latino of any race were 0.10% of the population.

There were 423 households, out of which 29.1% had children under the age of 18 living with them, 56.0% were married couples living together, 4.3% had a female householder with no husband present, and 36.2% were non-families. 33.1% of all households were made up of individuals, and 24.1% had someone living alone who was 65 years of age or older. The average household size was 2.27 and the average family size was 2.89.

23.0% are under the age of 18, 5.2% from 18 to 24, 25.2% from 25 to 44, 20.5% from 45 to 64, and 26.1% who were 65 years of age or older. The median age was 42 years. For every 100 females, there were 83.6 males. For every 100 females age 18 and over, there were 79.6 males.

The median income for a household in the city was $36,042, and the median income for a family was $42,250. Males had a median income of $30,231 versus $22,614 for females. The per capita income for the city was $17,157. About 2.8% of families and 4.9% of the population were below the poverty line, including 5.9% of those under age 18 and 4.8% of those age 65 or over.

Education
The North Cedar Community School District serves the community.  It was established on July 1, 1995 by the merger of the Clarence-Lowden Community School District and the Lincoln Community School District. The former was formed on July 1, 1973 by the merger of the Clarence and Lowden school districts.

References

External links
Official city website:
 http://clarenceia.org

Cities in Cedar County, Iowa
Cities in Iowa
1866 establishments in Iowa